is a passenger railway station in the city of Ōta, Gunma, Japan, operated by the private railway operator Tōbu Railway.

Lines

Station layout
The station is unstaffed and consists of a single island platform, connected to the station building by a footbridge.

Platforms

Adjacent stations

History
Serada Station opened on 1 October 1927.

From 17 March 2012, station numbering was introduced on all Tōbu lines, with Serada Station becoming "TI-21".

Passenger statistics
In fiscal 2019, the station was used by an average of 464 passengers daily (boarding passengers only).

Surrounding area
Former Ojima town hall
Serada Toshogu
Serada Post Office

References

External links

 Tobu station information 

Railway stations in Gunma Prefecture
Tobu Isesaki Line
Stations of Tobu Railway
Railway stations in Japan opened in 1927
Ōta, Gunma